"She's So High" is a power pop song written and performed by Canadian singer-songwriter Tal Bachman. It was released as a single to North American radio on February 13, 1999, from his self-titled debut album (1999). The song peaked at number three in Canada, topped the US Billboard Adult Top 40 chart, and reached number 14 on the Billboard Hot 100. It also became a top-10 hit in Australia and New Zealand and peaked at number 30 in the United Kingdom. American media group AllMusic named it an "album pick". The song won a BMI award and a Juno Award for Best Producer.

Background and writing
Tal Bachman wrote the song about an experience that he had in high school when he was trying to get a girl to date his stepbrother. "I attempted to bribe the hottest girl in our high school to go out on a date with [my stepbrother]," Bachman told MTV News. "So as the conversation between me and what I thought was this godly, exalted woman progressed, I began to feel more and more uncomfortable and awkward, and so I just remember that feeling... I don't want to say fear, but just kind of being in awe of her." The song was produced by Bob Rock and was recorded in Maui. Bachman stated he played both his father's '62 Stratocaster and a 12-string electric on the song. He also said that he drew some inspiration in writing it from Sheryl Crow's song "If It Makes You Happy".

Chart performance
The song debuted on Canada's RPM Top Singles chart on April 19, 1999, at number 18, the highest new entry of the week. For the next few weeks, the song descended the chart, but it began to gain popularity and eventually reached its peak of number three on June 28. It stayed there for another week before beginning its slow descent off the chart, last appearing at number 100 on July 24, 2000, over a year after its first appearance. It was the eighth best-selling single of 1999 in Canada. On the specific RPM genre charts, "She's So High" reached number three on the Rock Report chart and number 30 on the Adult Contemporary chart. In the United States, the song reached number 14 on the Billboard Hot 100 in August 1999, spending 28 weeks in the top 100, and peaked atop the Adult Top 40 chart in September for three weeks. It finished 1999 as the United States' 51st highest-selling song.

The song also found significant success in Australasia. It first appeared at number 44 on Australia's ARIA Singles Chart on the week of August 15, 1999. For the next four weeks, the song rose and fell in the top 30, then shot up to number 13 on September 19. It reached its peak of number eight the following week, then spent nine more nonconsecutive weeks in the top 50, ending the year as Australia's 54th best-selling single. In neighbouring New Zealand, "She's So High" debuted at number 46 on the RIANZ Singles Chart on October 3, then rose 37 positions to number nine—its peak position—the next week. It dropped to number 14 for two weeks, then to number 20 for another two weeks, then spent an additional four weeks in the top 50, logging 10 weeks on the chart altogether. Despite its relatively short charting period, it came in at number 50 on New Zealand's year-end chart.

In the United Kingdom, the song entered the UK Singles Chart at number 30 on October 24, fell to number 51 the following week, then left the top 100 the week after. Elsewhere in Europe, the song peaked at number 29 in Iceland, number 71 in Germany, and number 93 in the Netherlands.

Music video
The official music video features Yvonne Sciò dressed in angel's wings and World War II-era headgear, a leather pilot cap with aviator's goggles. She goes around town doing all kinds of stunts and tricks, annoying everybody, while the scene cuts to Bachman playing the song with his band.

Track listings and formats

 Australian, European, and Japanese maxi-CD single
 "She's So High"  – 3:44
 "Angeline"  – 3:43
 "Superstar"  – 2:53
 "Guilty"  – 3:31

 European CD single
 "She's So High"  – 3:44
 "Angeline"  – 3:43

 UK cassette single
 "She's So High"  – 3:44
 "Guilty"  – 3:31

 UK CD single
 "She's So High"  – 3:44
 "Angeline"  – 3:43
 "Paint a Pretty Picture"  – 3:51

Credits and personnel
Credits are taken from the Tal Bachman album booklet.

Studios
 Recorded and mixed at Plantation Mixing and Recording (Maui, Hawaii)
 Additional recording at The Shed (Vancouver, British Columbia)
 Mastered at Sterling Sound (New York City)

Personnel

 Tal Bachman – writing, lead and background vocals, lead guitar, lap steel guitar, rhythm guitar, piano, production, mixing
 Buck Johnson – background vocals, Wurlitzer, B3, Moog
 Chris Wyse – bass
 Lance Porter – drums
 Bob Rock – production, mixing
 Patrick Glover – additional recording engineer
 Brian Joseph Dobbs – engineering
 Mike Gillies – additional engineering
 George Marino – mastering

Charts

Weekly charts

Year-end charts

Certifications

Release history

Use in media
Twenty years after its original North American release, the song was featured in a television advertisement for the Peloton stationary bicycle, broadly televised in late November 2019.

Kurt Nilsen version

Four years after Bachman's hit, Norwegian singer Kurt Nilsen's cover version of the song reached number one in Norway and was Norway's best-selling single ever, selling over 80,000 copies to earn an octuple (8×) platinum certification. It became an international hit a year later, achieving its best success in Flanders and the Netherlands, reaching the top 10 in these regions.

Track listings
 Norway: RCA, BMG / 82876528502 (2003)
 Europe: RCA / 82876 61088 2 (2004)

 Europe: BMG / 82876 597 612 (2004)

 Europe: RCA / 82876 59828 2  (2004)

Charts

Weekly charts

Year-end charts

Certifications

Release history

References

1998 songs
1999 debut singles
2003 debut singles
Columbia Records singles
Number-one singles in Norway
Number-one singles in Poland
Power pop songs
Song recordings produced by Bob Rock
Sony Music singles